Jeffrey (Jeff) Thomas Alu (born January 1, 1966) is an American musician, photographer, graphic artist, and amateur astronomer who has participated in the Palomar Planet-Crossing Asteroid Survey. The asteroid 4104 Alu was named in his honour.

Discoveries 

Alu is credited by the Minor Planet Center with the discovery of 24 minor planets, including several near-Earth asteroids as well as some in the asteroid belt. Many of these discoveries were made in collaboration with American astronomers Eleanor F. Helin and Kenneth J. Lawrence. He also co-discovered 117P/Helin–Roman–Alu and 132P/Helin–Roman–Alu, two periodic comets.

List of discovered minor planets 

Co-discoveries made with  E. F. Helin and  K. J. Lawrence.

See also

References

External links 
 Alu's Personal Home Page

1966 births
20th-century  American astronomers
Discoverers of asteroids
Discoverers of comets

Living people